Malaysia competed at the 2017 Asian Indoor and Martial Arts Games held in Ashgabat, Turkmenistan from September 17 to 27. Malaysia sent 10 competitors for the multi-sport event. Malaysia clinched its only medal in the men's 64kg taekwondo event.

Participants

Medallist

References 

2017 in Malaysian sport
Nations at the 2017 Asian Indoor and Martial Arts Games